Władysław Krzyżanowski (1905-1985) was a sailor from Poland, who represented his country at the 1928 Summer Olympics in Amsterdam, Netherlands.

Sources 
 

1905 births
1985 deaths
Sportspeople from Minsk
People from Minsky Uyezd
People from the Russian Empire of Polish descent
Polish male sailors (sport)
Olympic sailors of Poland
Sailors at the 1928 Summer Olympics – 12' Dinghy